Sheikh Saeed Al Maktoum House is a historic building and former residential quarters of Saeed bin Maktoum Al Maktoum, former ruler of Dubai in the United Arab Emirates.

The building is located along the Dubai Creek in the locality of Al Shindagha area.  It was established around 1896 as the seat of the Al Maktoum family. The building is now a museum that contains artifacts and images of the old town of Dubai. The displays are distributed onto 9 wings, as follows: The History of Saeed Al Maktoum House, Al Maktoum Family, Old Dubai, Marine Life, Views from Dubai, Social Life in Dubai, Coins and Stamps, Historic Documents and Maps. The total area of building is 3,600 square meters.

The building remain the residency of Sheikh Saeed Al Maktoum since his death in 1958. The site is also birthplace of his sons and grandsons.

References

External links 
 Sheikh Saeed Al Maktoum House, Dubai Culture & Arts Authority
 

Houses completed in 1845
Museums in Dubai
Historic house museums in the United Arab Emirates
Al Maktoum, Saeed
Official residences in the United Arab Emirates
Royal residences in the United Arab Emirates